Mamre H. Ward was a member of the Wisconsin State Assembly.

Biography
Ward was born on January 16, 1899, in Durand, Wisconsin. He graduated from Durand High School. Ward was a farmer and lived in the town of Canton Buffalo County, Wisconsin. He was involved with the canning and banking business. Ward served as chairman of the Canton Town Board. Ward served in the Wisconsin Assembly from 1951 to 1959 and was a Republican. In 1964, Ward moved to Durand, Wisconsin. He died on October 13, 1969, in a hospital in Durand, Wisconsin.

References

People from Durand, Wisconsin
Businesspeople from Wisconsin
Farmers from Wisconsin
Mayors of places in Wisconsin
Republican Party members of the Wisconsin State Assembly
1899 births
1969 deaths
20th-century American politicians
People from Buffalo County, Wisconsin
20th-century American businesspeople